Dr. Eduardo V. Roquero or Dr. Ed (October 18, 1949 in Pigkawayan, North Cotabato, Philippines – August 24, 2009 in Manila) was a Filipino physician and politician.

Coming from a family of politicians, his father, an uncle and also one of his brothers all served as mayors of Pigkawayan, North Cotabato. Hon. Eduardo V. Roquero began as a Rural Health Physician and NGO Family Planning Physician of San Jose del Monte in the 1980s, at that time, he was also the owner and director of Roquero General Hospital.

He served as Municipal Mayor of San Jose del Monte from 1988–1992 and 1994–2000 and City Mayor of San Jose del Monte from 2000–2004 and 2007–2009, making him the first city mayor from the time San Jose del Monte was converted from a municipality in 2000 to become the province's first component city. Under his administration, San Jose del Monte was converted from a 5th Class to a 1st Class Municipality. He also served as the city's first Representative to the House of Representatives from the time its congressional district was carved out of the fourth congressional district of Bulacan.

Known as the Brain and Father of Cityhood and the Man behind San Jose del Monte's Golden Age of Governance, Hon. Eduardo V. Roquero received numerous recognitions and awards such as Most Outstanding Mayor of the Philippines in 2008 and Most Outstanding Congressman of the Philippines in 2006. A year after his death in 2009, he was given the "Dangal ng Lahing San Jose Award" which is the highest form of recognition to a public servant.

References

|-

1949 births
2009 deaths
20th-century Filipino medical doctors
Mayors of places in Bulacan
Members of the House of Representatives of the Philippines from San Jose del Monte
People from Cotabato
People from San Jose del Monte
Liberal Party (Philippines) politicians
Nationalist People's Coalition politicians
Laban ng Demokratikong Pilipino politicians
Lakas–CMD (1991) politicians
Kabalikat ng Malayang Pilipino politicians